
Judges who have served on the Supreme Court of Victoria , include :
 Chief Justices of Victoria
 Presidents of the Court of Appeal
 Judges of Appeal
 Judges
 Reserve judges

See also
 Judiciary of Australia
 Victorian Bar Association

Notes

External links
 Official Supreme Court of Victoria website

References

 
Victoria
Judges of the Supreme Court